San Pedro, also known as San Pedro Well and Viopoli or Viopuli is a populated place situated in Pima County, Arizona, United States.

Geography

Location
Located on the east side of the San Pedro River, it is thought it might be the site of the original Old Presidio of San Pedro, which can be seen on maps as early as 1879.

History
A post office opened at the location on April 22, 1872.

References

Populated places in Pima County, Arizona